Vladimír Masár (born 2 May 1958 in Partizánske, Czechoslovakia) served as the first Governor of National Bank of Slovakia between 1993 and 1999. As the first Central Bank governor of a newly independent Slovakia, he was in charge of introducing a stabilizing a new currency - the Slovak crown and building up a professional apparatus and international contacts at the National Bank of Slovakia from the scratch. As a governor, he continued the conservative tradition of Czechoslovak monetary policy and prevented monetary turmoil despite irresponsible fiscal policies of Mečiar's government.

Career
After graduating from the University of Economics in Bratislava in 1988 he worked in several commercial banks before becoming deputy Finance minister of the newly founded Slovak Republic. He was chairman of the preparatory commission for the establishment of the National Bank of Slovakia and became its first governor. After the end of his term as a Governor, he became a chairman of the Slovak branch of Deloitte. In May 2020 he retired upon reaching the mandatory retirement age for partners at Deloitte of 62 years.

Controversy
Shortly before Masár's retirement, Deloitte faced accusations by several high-profile politicians, including the Economy Minister Richard Sulík, of facilitating siphoning away public money. Masár denied all allegations.

References

1958 births
Governors of the National Bank of Slovakia
Living people
People from Partizánske
University of Economics in Bratislava alumni